Allan Bruce McKinnon, (11 January 1917 – 19 September 1990) was a Canadian politician.

Born in Canora, Saskatchewan, he served with the Royal Canadian Artillery and was officer with the Princess Patricia's Canadian Light Infantry. In 1945, he was awarded the Military Cross. After the war, he remained in the Canadian Army. He retired with the rank of major in 1965 and settled in Victoria, British Columbia. He then taught at Sangster Elementary School in Colwood. From 1968 to 1972, he was a trustee and later chairman of the Victoria School Board.

McKinnon was first elected to the House of Commons of Canada in the 1972 federal election as the Progressive Conservative Member of Parliament for Victoria, British Columbia. He was re-elected on four successive occasions, and served from 1979 to 1980 as Minister of National Defence and Minister of Veterans Affairs in the short-lived minority government of Joe Clark.

McKinnon retired from politics at the 1988 federal election. He died at Royal Jubilee Hospital in Victoria, British Columbia in 1990 due to cancer.

References

External links
 

1917 births
1990 deaths
Canadian military personnel of World War II
Members of the 21st Canadian Ministry
Members of the King's Privy Council for Canada
Members of the House of Commons of Canada from British Columbia
People from Canora, Saskatchewan
Defence ministers of Canada
Politicians from Victoria, British Columbia
Progressive Conservative Party of Canada MPs
Canadian recipients of the Military Cross
Deaths from cancer in British Columbia